River is the second EP by British musician Coby Sey. Sey wrote and recorded the EP in the Westfjords region in Iceland in February 2020, as cases of COVID-19 grew worldwide. The sixth track, "River ⟳" consists of the first five tracks uninterrupted.

Track listing
All tracks written and produced by Coby Sey.

Personnel
Coby Sey – primary artist, production, instrumentation, artwork, art direction, photography, photography direction, mixing, engineering

References

External links
 

2020 EPs
Coby Sey albums